The 2014 Setanta Sports Cup was the ninth and final staging of the annual all-Ireland football competition. It commenced on 24 February 2014 and concluded on 10 May 2014 with the final.

Shamrock Rovers were the defending champions, following a comfortable 7–1 win over Drogheda United in the 2013 final. This season's competition was reduced in size from twelve clubs down to eight, with four clubs representing each league. The competition was originally going to feature Linfield, who were inaugural winners of this competition in 2005 and had appeared in all eight editions of the competition to date, and 2012–13 IFA Premiership champions Cliftonville. However, both clubs declined the invitation to take part. The clubs cited the difficulty faced by supporters to attend away games, inconvenient match scheduling, and the reduced prize fund as reasons for deciding not to enter. As a result, the fifth and sixth placed sides from the 2012–13 IFA Premiership – Ballinamallard United and Coleraine – were drafted in as replacements.

The competition featured two-legged quarter-finals, semi-finals, and a single-match final.

Prize money
A prize fund of €73,000 (£60,000) was distributed in the competition, with €33,000 going to the winners, the runners-up collecting €13,000, and the other six participants collecting €4,500 each.

Winners: €33,000 (£27,000)
Runners-up: €13,000 (£10,700)
Semi-finalists: €4,500 (£3,700)
Quarter-finalists: €4,500 (£3,700)

Qualifiers
The following clubs entered this year's competition:

 Republic of Ireland
 Dundalk (2013 League of Ireland runners-up)
 Shamrock Rovers (holders)
 Sligo Rovers (2013 FAI Cup winners)
 St Patrick’s Athletic (2013 League of Ireland champions)

 Northern Ireland
 Ballinamallard United (5th in 2012–13 IFA Premiership)
 Coleraine (6th in 2012–13 IFA Premiership)
 Crusaders (2012–13 IFA Premiership runners-up)
 Glentoran (2012–13 Irish Cup winners)

Quarter-finals
The quarter-final draw was made on 11 December 2013, with the first legs played on 24 February 2014 and the second legs played on 10 and 17 March 2014. The four League of Ireland and four IFA Premiership clubs played each other in the quarter-finals over two games (home and away) with the winners qualifying for the semi-finals. Clubs from the same association were kept apart for the draw. All four League of Ireland clubs defeated their Northern Irish Premiership opponents.

|}

First Legs

Second Legs

St Patrick's Athletic won 6–0 on aggregate.

Sligo Rovers won 9–1 on aggregate.

Dundalk won 4–3 on aggregate.

Shamrock Rovers won 5–1 on aggregate.

Semi-finals
The winners of the four quarter-finals entered this round, with the same format as the quarter-finals.

|}

First Legs

Second Legs

Sligo Rovers won 7–1 on aggregate.

Dundalk won 3–1 on aggregate.

Final

References 

2014
1
2013–14 in Northern Ireland association football